La Morena de Oro del Perú is an album by Lucha Reyes released on the FTA label (FLPS-86) in 1970. The album was produced by Viñico Tafur. It was Reyes' first album.

Track listing
Side A
 "Regresa" (Augusto Polo Campos)
 "La Flor de la Canela" (Chabuca Granda)
 "Tu Voz" (Juan Gonzalo Rose, Víctor Merino)
 "Como una Rosa Roja" (María Gladys Pratz)
 "Aunque Me Odies" (Felix Figueroa)
 "Morena la Flor de Lima" (Augusto Polo Campos

Side B 
 "Jose Antonio" (Chabuca Granda)
 "Qué Importa" (Juan Mosto Domecq)
 "Qué Cosa Tú Me Has Hecho" (Freddy Roland)
 "Mi Jardín" (Luis Gálvez Ronceros)
 "Cariño Malo" (Augusto Polo Campos)
 "Soy Peruana, Soy Piurana" (María Gladys Pratz)

References

1970 debut albums
Spanish-language albums